The Cornell Big Red men's soccer program represents the Cornell University in all NCAA Division I men's college soccer competitions. Founded in 1908, the Big Red compete in the Ivy League. The Big Red are coached by John Smith, a former professional player and assistant coach for the Stanford Cardinal men's soccer program. Cornell plays their home matches at Charles F. Berman Field.

Roster

Team honors

National championships 
ISFA National Champion (1): 1934

Conference championships 
Ivy League (4): 1975*, 1977, 1995*, 2012

(* shared title)

Individual honors 
The following players have been awarded as All-Americans by United Soccer Coaches or Intercollegiate Soccer Football Association.

First-Team All Americans

Second-Team All-Americans

Third-Team All-Americans

Seasons

Year-by-year 

The Big Red have sponsored varsity soccer for 111 seasons. They have a combined record of 510–545–148.

NCAA Tournament history 

Cornell has appeared in 11 NCAA Tournaments. Their most recent appearance came in 2022.

References

External links 
 

 
1908 establishments in New York (state)
Association football clubs established in 1908